This is a table of orthonormalized spherical harmonics that employ the Condon-Shortley phase up to degree . Some of these formulas are expressed in terms of the Cartesian expansion of the spherical harmonics into polynomials in x, y, z, and r.

Complex spherical harmonics 

For ℓ = 0, …, 5, see.

ℓ = 0

ℓ = 1

ℓ = 2

ℓ = 3

ℓ = 4

ℓ = 5

ℓ = 6

ℓ = 7

ℓ = 8

ℓ = 9

ℓ = 10

Visualization of complex spherical harmonics

2D polar/azimuthal angle maps 

Below the complex spherical harmonics are represented on 2D plots with the azimuthal angle, on the horizontal axis and the polar angle, on the vertical axis. The saturation of the color at any point represents the magnitude of the spherical harmonic and the hue represents the phase.

Polar plots 

Below the complex spherical harmonics are represented on polar plots. The magnitude of the spherical harmonic at particular polar and azimuthal angles is represented by the saturation of the color at that point and the phase is represented by the hue at that point.

Polar plots with magnitude as radius 

Below the complex spherical harmonics are represented on polar plots. The magnitude of the spherical harmonic at particular polar and azimuthal angles is represented by the radius of the plot at that point and the phase is represented by the hue at that point.

Real spherical harmonics

For each real spherical harmonic, the corresponding atomic orbital symbol (s, p, d, f) is reported as well.

For ℓ = 0, …, 3, see.

ℓ = 0

ℓ = 1

ℓ = 2

ℓ = 3

ℓ = 4

Visualization of real spherical harmonics

2D polar/azimuthal angle maps 

Below the real spherical harmonics are represented on 2D plots with the azimuthal angle, on the horizontal axis and the polar angle, on the vertical axis. The saturation of the color at any point represents the magnitude of the spherical harmonic and the hue represents the phase.

Polar plots 

Below the real spherical harmonics are represented on polar plots. The magnitude of the spherical harmonic at particular polar and azimuthal angles is represented by the saturation of the color at that point and the phase is represented by the hue at that point.

Polar plots with magnitude as radius 

Below the real spherical harmonics are represented on polar plots. The magnitude of the spherical harmonic at particular polar and azimuthal angles is represented by the radius of the plot at that point and the phase is represented by the hue at that point.

Polar plots with amplitude as elevation 

Below the real spherical harmonics are represented on polar plots. The amplitude of the spherical harmonic (magnitude and sign) at a particular polar and azimuthal angle is represented by the elevation of the plot at that point above or below the surface of a uniform sphere. The magnitude is also represented by the saturation of the color at a given point. The phase is represented by the hue at a given point.

See also
Spherical harmonics

External links
 Spherical Harmonics at MathWorld
 Spherical Harmonics 3D representation

References

Cited references

General references 
For complex spherical harmonics, see also SphericalHarmonicY[l,m,theta,phi] at Wolfram Alpha, especially for specific values of l and m.

Special hypergeometric functions